China's Next Top Model Cycle 3 is the third Cycle of the Chinese reality TV series, based on the international version and spin-off to the original, America's Next Top Model.

The show was produced by Chinese television subscription channel Sichuan Satellite TV and it is filmed in Shanghai, the casting was held in selected cities of China - Hangzhou, Nanjing, Guangzhou, Nanning, Dalian, Wuhan, Changsha, and Chengdu. It began airing on June 13, 2010.

Among the prizes for this season was: a contract with Hengdian World Studios, an appearance on the cover of Marie Claire China plus will join the yearly Marie Claire China fashion ceremony, become a spokesperson of Wahaha products, represent China on the World Supermodel Finals 2011 and act in a charitable fashion drama "美麗模坊之明日天後" (the day after the competition).

The winner of the competition was 18-year-old Mao Chu Yu from Chengdu, Sichuan.

Contestants
(ages stated are at start of contest)

Episodes

Episode 1

First casting episode.

Episode 2

Second casting episode

Episode 3

Third casting episode

Quit:  Ling & Jia An Qi

Episode 4

First call-out: Zhu Yue
Bottom two: Huang Qi & Zhu Yan	   	
Eliminated: Zhu Yan

Episode 5

First call-out: Zhao Yi Fei
Bottom two: Sun Yue & Wang Sheng Jie	   	
Eliminated: Sun Yue

Episode 6

Quit: Zhao Yi Fei
First call-out: Wang Sheng Jie
Bottom two: Lin Jia Yi & Shi Yu 	   	
Eliminated: Shi Yu

Episode 7

First call-out: Lin Jia Yi 
Bottom two: Chaochang Yi Lan & Huang Qi	   	
Eliminated: Chaochang Yi Lan

Episode 8

First call-out: Wang Sheng Jie
Bottom two: Lin Jia Yi & Zhu Yue 	   	
Eliminated: Zhu Yue

Episode 9

First call-out: Lin Jia Yi	 
Bottom two: Huang Qi & Mao Chu Yu  	
Eliminated: None

Episode 10

First call-out: Mao Chu Yu
Bottom two: Huang Qi & Lin Jia Yi	   	
Eliminated: Huang Qi

Episode 11

First call-out: Mao Chu Yu
Bottom two: Lin Jia Yi & Wang Sheng Jie 	   	
Eliminated: Wang Sheng Jie
Final two: Lin Jia Yi & Mao Chu Yu
China's Next Top Model: Mao Chu Yu

Summaries

Call-out order

 The contestant quit the competition
 The contestant was eliminated
 The contestant was part of a non-elimination bottom two.
 The contestant won the competition

 In the beginning of episode 4, Ling and An Qi, quit the competition due to scholar issues , they were replaced by Yi Fei and Yu in the beginning of the  challenge.
 In episode 6, Yi Fei decided quit the competition, due to School exams.
 In episode 9, there was a non-elimination.

Average call-out order
Final two are not included.

Photo shoot guide
Episode 4 photo shoot: Glamorous gowns in an ice cellar
Episode 5 photo shoot: Wahaha water in sportswear
Episode 6 photo shoot: Wahaha goddesses
Episode 7 photo shoot: Emotional Moulin Rouge
Episode 8 commercial:  Sichuan tourism
Episode 8 photo shoot: Phantoms of ancient Chinese princesses
Episode 9 photo shoot: Army fighters in groups
Episode 10 photo shoot: Marie Claire covers
Episode 11 commercial: Wahaha commercial

Makeovers
Yu: Cut shorter with blunt ends
Yi Lan: Cut chin-length and China doll bangs added
Yue Z.: Mia Farrow haircut (Rosemary's Baby) and dyed dark violet
Qi: Scruffier and dyed two tones
Sheng Jie: Cut into a bob, dyed blonde on one side
Jia Yi: Ombre style long weave and dyed platinum blonde
Chu Yu: Cut to the collarbone, dyed darker, and highlights added

External links

2010 Chinese television seasons
China's Next Top Model